Len Isleifson is a Canadian provincial politician, who was elected as the Member of the Legislative Assembly of Manitoba for the riding of Brandon East in the 2016 election. He is a member of the Progressive Conservative party, and defeated incumbent NDP MLA Drew Caldwell in the election.

Isleifson made news wires outside of public office during the 2018 FIFA World Cup. When Iceland qualified for the event, he decided to examine whether he was related to any national team members, seeing it as an opportunity to secure bragging rights among his friends. He told his father about his project, and they contacted Icelandic Roots, a company that specializes in Icelandic genealogy research, and discovered that they were related to 22 of the 23 players on the World Cup squad, as well as manager Heimir Hallgrímsson. Following the discovery, Isleifson attempted to set up a post-World Cup meeting with the team in Iceland, with the assistance of Iceland's consul general in Winnipeg.

Electoral history

References 

Living people
Canadian people of Icelandic descent
Politicians from Brandon, Manitoba
Progressive Conservative Party of Manitoba MLAs
21st-century Canadian politicians
Year of birth missing (living people)